Badger Valley [elevation: ] is a valley in Sauk County, in the U.S. state of Wisconsin.

Badger Valley was named from the badgers seen there by early settlers.

References

Landforms of Sauk County, Wisconsin
Valleys of Wisconsin